James William Collier (September 28, 1872 – September 28, 1933) was a politician from the U.S. state of Mississippi.

Born on the Glenwood Plantation near Vicksburg in 1872, he graduated from the University of Mississippi at Oxford in 1894 with a degree in law. Later that year, he was admitted to the Bar association and commenced practice in Vicksburg.

Collier's political career began in 1896, when he was elected to the Mississippi House of Representatives. He remained in that position until 1899. From 1900 to 1909, he served as Warren County's circuit clerk.

Running successfully as the Democratic Party candidate in the state's eighth congressional district, he took office on March 4, 1909 and went on to serve in eleven congresses (61st-72nd).

Collier chaired the United States House Committee on Ways and Means during the 72nd Congress (1930–1932). He decided not to run for a twelfth term due to controversy over whether candidates should run at-large or by districts.

President Franklin D. Roosevelt appointed him to the United States Tariff Commission. He served in that position from March 28, 1933 until his death on September 28, 1933, his 61st birthday.

He is buried at Cedar Hill Cemetery in Vicksburg.

References 

  - Biographical Directory of the United States Congress
 James William Collier - The Political Graveyard

1872 births
1933 deaths
People from Warren County, Mississippi
Democratic Party members of the Mississippi House of Representatives
Democratic Party members of the United States House of Representatives from Mississippi
University of Mississippi School of Law alumni